Basira Joya is an Afghan former television news anchor who fled to the United States in 2021 as the Taliban took control of Afghanistan.

Early life and education 
Her father worked as a police officer. Basira studied economics at Kabul University.

Career 
Joya worked as a news anchor at the women-owned Zan TV before working at Ariana Television Network. During the Taliban's 2021 rise to power in Afghanistan, she spoke to The Independent newspaper about the slow evacuation of journalists from Afghanistan by European nations and the United States. The same year, she faced threats and went into hiding before fleeing to the United States, to live in Dayton, Ohio.

In Ohio, Joya took employment in a factory.

References 

Afghan emigrants to the United States
Afghan refugees
Afghan journalists
Afghan women journalists
Kabul University alumni